NGC 3697 is a spiral galaxy in the constellation of Leo. It was discovered on 24 February 1827 by John Herschel. It was described as "extremely faint, very small, extended 90°" by John Louis Emil Dreyer, the compiler of the New General Catalogue. It is a member of HCG 53, a compact group of galaxies.

References

Notes

External links 
 

Intermediate spiral galaxies
Leo (constellation)
3697
06479
035347